The Terry's Plain Historic District is a  historic district in the town of Simsbury, Connecticut that was listed on the National Register of Historic Places in 1993.  The district is significant as a preserved rural landscape.  It included 27 contributing buildings of various architectural styles, including Greek Revival, Federal and Late Victorian architecture, and 17 non-contributing buildings.

Thirteen houses that were parts of farm complexes and 14 agricultural outbuildings ranging from sheds to large tobacco barns.

Contributing sites include:
 A field where the militia drilled in 1683 (or 1685)
 Lucius D. Goodrich House, 36 Ferry Lane, Federal/Greek Revival
 64 Terry's Plain Road, Late Victorian

Traine Band (Militia)

Simsbury was founded as a town in 1670. Not long thereafter, the town established a militia, then known as a "traine band". The date of establishment of the militia is not known, but records of assemblies date to 1673. The Grand Committee of the Militia met in Hartford on August 11, 1673 to organize militia against a potential attack by the enemy. The Committee ordered the raising of 500 "dragoones" from the state, of which 160 were to come from Hartford County. At that meeting, Simon Wolcott and John Griffin of Simsbury were appointed to command the Simsbury Traine Band, which at that time numbered seven "dragoones".

The Committee included the following order:

Two years later, John Griffin was confirmed as sergeant of the Traine Band and placed in command.

First home and first ferry

The first home in Simsbury was located in the Terry's Plain area. The land where the house would be built was granted in 1653 to Thomas Ford, although a house would not be built until approximately 1660, when Captain Aaron Cook, the son-in-law of Thomas Ford, built the first home in Simsbury.

In the same general area, a ferry was established to facilitate crossing of the Farmington River. The exact date of the origin of the Pent Street Ferry is not known, but a road to the ferry was commissioned in 1668.

First school

The first school in Simsbury was located in Terry's Plain. The town agreed, at a town meeting on December 17, 1701, to "agree with and appoint a school  master".  The first day of school commenced on the first day of January 1702. The town discussed whether the school should be located on the east or west side of the river, and chose both, with the first three months to be held at a location in Terry's Plain, and then  at a location in "Weatoug" on the west side.

See also

National Register of Historic Places listings in Hartford County, Connecticut

Notes 

National Register of Historic Places in Hartford County, Connecticut
Greek Revival architecture in Connecticut
Federal architecture in Connecticut
Simsbury, Connecticut
Victorian architecture in Connecticut
Historic districts in Hartford County, Connecticut
Historic districts on the National Register of Historic Places in Connecticut